The Cod Alliance Treaty was a 1350 or 1351 treaty by which a number of nobles and cities allied with William V of Holland against his mother Margaret II, Countess of Hainaut and her allies. It was signed in the first phase of the Hook and Cod wars.

Context

Emergence of the Cod Alliance 
Count William III of Holland, successfully reigned Holland, Zeeland and Hainaut from 1304 to 1337. An aspect of his reign that caused long term problems in Holland and Zeeland was that he let Willem van Duvenvoorde (c. 1290-1353) manage the internal affairs of Holland. This enabled Van Duvenvoorde and his relatives, the families: Wasseaar, Polanen, Brederode, Boechorst, etc. to amass fiefs and great fortunes. This to the detriment of families like: Arkel, Egmond, Heemskerk and Wateringen. It led to ever growing irritation and resentment with those families who were left out, and steadily lost goods. This formed one of the key causes of the later Hook and Cod wars.

The short reign of Count William IV (1337-1345) was less successful. The favoritism towards the Duvenvoorde clan continued, while the financial situation got out of hand due to the lifestyle of the count. Nevertheless, the count kept the peace in Holland.

Count William IV was killed during his failed expedition to Friesland in late September 1345. The lack of a clear heir caused chaos and confusion that was increased by an invasion by the Bishop of Utrecht. By this time the nobility had long been divided in two parties: pro and contra Van Duvenvoorde, and was arduous to fight. The Duvenvoorde clan would later become known as the 'Hook' faction, their enemies became known as the 'Cod' faction. Most of the cities of Holland inclined to the Cod faction.

In early 1346 Margaret II, Countess of Hainaut became count of Holland, Zeeland and Hainault. She restored order, and made her second son William of Bavaria her lieutenant in Holland. He was assisted by a council that was again dominated by Van Duvenvoorde, and so nothing was done to quiet the nobility and rebellious cities. Soon, insubordination and anarchy took over in Holland and Zeeland.

In September 1350 Margaret then deposed William, who had begun to act as count of Holland. With William imprisoned in Hainault, the Hooks seemed victorious, but by February 1351, the Cods had freed Count William, who became their leader.

First use of the names Hook and Cod 
Therefore, the Cod alliance treaty does not refer to a Cod faction or treaty in any way. The first time that the alliance, or faction, was labelled as such was in 1428. The Treaty of Delft signed in July 1428, explicitly forbade the use of the faction names Hook and Cod:  (Neither speak of Hook nor Cod).

The Cod Alliance Treaty

The significance of the Cod Alliance Treaty 
The Cod Alliance Treaty is a document which was retrieved in archives way after the end of the Hook and Cod wars (1350-1490). Without a direct contemporary reference to this treaty, it is hard to determine its exact significance. This is complicated by the fact that the treaty only survives in copy, and that these copies are inconsistent about the year it was signed; i.e. 1350 or 1351, see below.

If the treaty was drafted on 23 May 1350, it can be considered as one of the causes of the Hook and Cod wars. I.e. the Cod faction making an alliance to fight a civil war, before fighting started in earnest in about April 1351. If the document is dated to 23 May 1351 or later, it would have a more defensive character.

What is certain, is that the Cod alliance itself already existed before 19 November 1350. On that day Gijsbrecht of Nijenrode joined the alliance of Jan of Arkel, Jan of Culemborg, Jan of Egmond, Jan Persijn of Waterland, Gerrit of Heemskerk, Jan of Wateringen, Gerrit van Egmond, and the cities of Delft, Haarlem, Leiden, Amsterdam, Rotterdam and Schiedam, and mentioned as enemies: Willem van Duvenvoorde, Jan van Polanen, and all who allied with these two.

Even though the exact date of the treaty is still in doubt, the text is very significant. It confirms later writings about the Hook and Cod Wars, and shows the extend of the divisions in Holland.

The treaty text

Copies and other treaties 
The treaty text has survived in copies that are not completely identical. It first appeared in print in a 1636 work by Van Gouthoeven. In 1667 a book by the lawyer Simon van Leeuwen followed. 

This is confusing, because it is a different kind of treaty. In it Count Willem promises not to alienate any part of the county, nor to grant any fiefs or tax exemptions, in the coming year. It therefore has a very different content from the Cod Alliance Treaty.

The signatories and adversaries 
After announcing himself as William Duke of Bavaria, Count of Holland, and Lord of Friesland, the count begins to sum up his Cod allies. The treaty carefully notes whether these are knights or squires, and whether they are lord of some fief. These allies had stood by the count and would continue to do so, in order to help him remain count and lord in Holland, Zeeland and Friesland, and to protect him against their mutual enemies, who wanted to drive them out and steal their possessions. The treaty then continues with summing up the enemies of the Cod alliance. These do get their rank as knight or squire, but are not marked as lord of a fief.

The Cod alliance members 
Knights:
Jan Lord of Arkel
Jan Lord of Egmond
Jan Persijn Lord of Waterland
Gerrit Lord of Heemskerk
Jan van Wateringen
Jan de Moelnaar
Gerrit van Egmond
Jan van Blommenstein
Willem van Wateringen
Squires:
Jan van Arkel
Jan Lord of Culemborg
Jan van Noordeloos
Hendrik van Heemskerk Hendrikszoon
Daniel van Toloysen
Cities:
Dordrecht
Delft
Leiden
Haarlem
Amsterdam
Alkmaar
Medemblik
Oudewater
Geertruidenberg
Schiedam
Rotterdam

Their enemies (Hook)
Knights:
Sir Willem van Duvenvoorde
Sir Jan van Polanen
The brothers of John of Polanen
Sir Dirk van Brederode (also erroneously named Willem)  
Sir Arent van Duvenvoorde
Sir Jacob van de Binkhorst
Sir Herper van de Binkhorst
Sir Harper van Rieden
Sir Floris van de Boukhorst
Sir Gerard van Heemstede
Sir Jan van Meerensteyne Aelbertsz
Sir Willem van Oudshoorn
Sir Dirk of Raaphorst
Sir Geard of Poelgeest
Priest:
Sir Mathijs van der Burgh
Squires:
Jan van Noordwijk
Jan van der Made
Reinier Dever son of Lord Gerrit
Gerrit Dever Jansz.
Floris van Raaphorst
Christiaan and Wouter van Raaphorst
The other Raaphorst brothers sons of Gerrit
Arend van Groeneveld
Dirk van Groeneveld
Jan van den Burch
Jan Symonsz. van der Burch

The count then continues by stating that he takes responsibility for the actions that his helpers and friends take to hurt his enemies. Next came the important promise that without the consent of his allies mentioned in the treaty, William would not allow their enemies on his territories, would not make peace with them, and would not allow them back on the possessions they had forfeited. Of course William did want to make peace with the cities that opposed him. This seems a logical explanation why the list of his enemies did not include cities. 

The same condition of not acting without the consent of his allies applied to William alienating part of his lands or his future inheritance the County of Hainault.

William named his younger brother Albert as his successor in case he would not have legal offspring. Albert would be bound to the alliance treaty and the promise not to let the Hooks back into his territories. The treaty / letter ends with a note that it was sealed and dated.

The date of the treaty 
The original letter or charter of the treaty survived until the seventeenth century. Van Gouthoeven more or less claims to have seen it. In his printed text it is dated: Sunday, that is the 23rd Day of May 1351.  is currently known as Trinity Sunday.

The difference in these dates has triggered a long discussion amongst historians. In 1754 Van Mieris printed 23 May 1751, but noted that this had to be 1750, because Trinity Sunday fell on that day in 1750, but was on 11 June in 1751.

In 1991 Historians Prevenier and Smit gave three kinds of reasons why the date of the treaty should be 12 June 1351. The formal reasons centered on that Gouthoeven more or less claimed that he saw the original. They supposed that the treaty survived in city archives in Leiden and Dordrecht, with the Leiden text getting the year corrupted to 1350. Van Leeuwen would have used these texts. Gouthoeven's text and a 16th century manuscript would stem from copies kept by nobles. The reason for this reconstruction was that Gouthoeven claimed that the original text was with the heirs of Floris 's Serclaes, bailiff of Schoonhoven. As regards content Prevenier and Smit stated that Jan van Noordeloos still supported Margaret in March 1351. Dordrecht would only join William on 16 April 1351, and Geertruidenberg would do so only on 15 June 1351. The third reason centers on the date. On 23 May 1351 Count William was in Zeeland, from 12 to 17 June he was in Dordrecht, while Geertruidenberg joined his side. The date would then become Trinity Sunday, that is 12 June 1351. Prevenieer and Smit therefore suppose that the calculation 23 May that came with the 1351 texts was a later (obviously wrong) addition by a clerk.  

In 1982 The historian Brokken put the year of the treaty to 1350. In 1998 the year 1350 was again defended by Van Wallene. He stated that the medieval extensive date description could only point to 1350, and that a later error could just as well be made in the year as in the day and month. As regards content he states that by 12 June 1351 the fight was not finished, and many Hooks were still in the county. In general, Wallene appreciates the text as a Cod alliance concluded on 23 May 1350, without William, who would have to join and seal it later. He furthermore states that Hendrik van Heemskerk could have been included in the treaty by his family member Gerard van Heemskerk, and that Jan van Noordeloos was a Cod member before his March 1351 pledge of fealty to Margret. He also states that Dordrecht and Geertruidenberg were members of an alliance in May 1350. With regard to the text, Wallene then continues by stating that the surviving manuscripts all give 23 May, and that Trinity Sunday 23 May can only refer to 1350. As regards content, Wallene notes that some notable Cods from 1351 do not appear in it. These were: Gijsbrecht van Nijenrode (joined in November 1350, see above), Gerard of Herlaer and Gerard van Merxem (joined January 1351). The latter two freed the count from his prison in Hainault in February 1351, and were then included in the county's council. Wallene sees only 1350 as compatible with the omission of these lords. The part played by the cities would also be strange with a date in 1351, because so little was agreed upon with regard to financial support and influence. Finally Wallene cites Brokken as claiming that the content of the treaty would have made it useless if it had been concluded in June 1351.

In his 2017 work about the Herlaer family Van Doornmalen gave a logical explanation why Gerard van Herlaer could have been omitted in June 1351, but also concluded that the debate about the year was still open.

The Cod City Alliance 
On 26 September 1351 12 Cod cities made another alliance. These were the 11 cities of the Cod Alliance Treaty plus Vlaardingen. These made a treaty to mutually protect their citizens from aggression caused by the way the count handled his affairs. This treaty has been very well preserved, with 11 of the 12 city seals still attached.

References

Notes

Hook and Cod wars